Stade, officially the Hanseatic City of Stade is a city in Lower Saxony in northern Germany. First mentioned in records in 934, it is the seat of the district which bears its name. Within the area of the city are the urban districts of Bützfleth, Hagen, Haddorf and Wiepenkathen, each of which have a council of their own with some autonomous decision-making rights.

Stade is located in the lower regions of the river Elbe. It is also on the German Timber-Frame Road.

History
The first human settlers came to the Stade area in 30,000 BC.

Since 1180 Stade belonged to the Prince-Archbishopric of Bremen. In early 1208 King Valdemar II of Denmark and his troops conquered Stade. In August Valdemar II's cousin being in enmity with the king, the then Prince-Archbishop Valdemar reconquered the city only to lose it soon after again to Valdemar II. In 1209 Emperor Otto IV persuaded his ally Valdemar II to withdraw into the north of the Elbe, and the deposed Prince-Archbishop Valdemar took Stade.

On 2 May 1209 Otto IV granted important town privileges to Stade. Otto IV confirmed the burghers to be personally free and recognised them constituting a political entity of their own law, the burgenses and optimi cives of Stade. Property within the municipal boundaries could not be subjected to feudal overlordship and was to be freely inherited without feudal claims to reversion. Fair juridical procedures were constituted and maximal fines fixed. Otto IV obliged himself to prevent burghers from being taken as hostages and to liberate captured burghers.

After Otto IV had changed his mind and reinvested Prince-Archbishop Valdemar with the See in 1211, Valdemar II recaptured Stade. In 1213 Otto's elder brother Count Palatine Henry V of the Rhine, reconquered Stade for the Prince-Archbishop. In 1215 Henry repelled another Danish attack on Stade. In the winter of 1216 Valdemar II and his Danish troops, unable to take the city of Stade, ravaged the County of Stade. From then on Stade remained a part of the Prince-Archbishopric of Bremen.

In medieval times (from the 13th century to the late 17th century), Stade was a prominent member of the Hanseatic League, but was later eclipsed by Hamburg. In 1611 the city signed a contract with Sephardic Jews, allowing the foundation of a community. In 1613, Johan Friedrich, Administrator of the Prince-Archbishopric, followed by settling Ashkenazic Jews in the city, but during the turmoil of Catholic conquest and Lutheran reconquest the last archival traces of Jews date from 1630. In 1648, by the Treaty of Westphalia, the Prince-Archbishopric of Bremen underwent a constitutional transformation from a prince-bishopric into a monarchy, the Duchy of Bremen. The duchy and the neighboured Principality of Verden, colloquially referred to as Bremen-Verden, were granted by the Treaty of Westphalia as an appanage to the Swedish crown. Stade, already under Swedish occupation since 1645, was a part of the Swedish province of Bremen-Verden-Wildeshausen from 1645 to 1712, and some of the buildings built by the Swedes are still in use today.

Swedish fortress
Stade's heyday lasted until the Thirty Years' War. In 1628 Tilly conquered the town; shortly thereafter, Sweden took possession of it until 1636. After a period of Danish occupation, Sweden finally recaptured it in 1643 and was also officially granted possession of it, together with the Archbishopric of Bremen, in the Peace of Westphalia. Two-thirds of the town were razed in the great town fire on 26 May 1659. The town was rebuilt again to the same plan.

From 1675 to 1676, in the Swedish-Brandenburg War, Swedish Stade was conquered during a campaign by Denmark and several states of the Holy Roman Empire and remained in allied hands until the end of that war in 1679. Stade, as the headquarters of the Swedish Stadhalter, was besieged from early April 1676 to 13 Aug 1676. In the wake of the Treaty of Saint Germain in 1679, Stade was once again awarded to Sweden.

The Elbe customs station near Stade, in Brunshausen at the mouth of the Schwinge, played special role in trading on the River Elbe from the period of the archbishopric. In 1663, the Swedes stationed an Elbe customs frigate as a permanent patrol ship. This arrangement continued to exist under various rulers until 1850 and the customs station on the Schwinge fieldworks itself existed until 1865.

Swedish sovereignty ended in 1712. Danish troops besieged the town in the Great Northern War and shelled it from 29 August to 7 September 1712 that destroyed 152 houses, a quarter of the built-up area.

During the Swedish times Stade was the capital of the province.

Danish rule
In 1712 Denmark conquered Stade and the whole of Bremen-Verden. Stade remained Bremen-Verden's capital also after the Danes ceded it to the Electorate of Hanover in 1715. When in 1823 Bremen-Verden was replaced by new administrative forms, Stade continued to be the capital of the Stade region.

In 1355 and in 1712, Stade suffered from the plague epidemic, which killed at least 30–40% of the city's population.

On 26 May 1659 a huge fire destroyed 60% of the city.

Early modern and modern period
In 1757 following the French Invasion of Hanover, the Army of Observation under Prince William, Duke of Cumberland, and the Privy Council of Hanover (government) took shelter in Stade. Cumberland prepared to defend the town before agreeing the Convention of Klosterzeven which brought about a temporary armistice.

By the end of the 17th century Ashkenazi Jews reappeared in Stade. In 1842 the Kingdom of Hanover granted equal rights to Jews and promoted to build up Jewish congregations and a regional superstructure (rabbinate) within a nationwide scope. The Jews in Stade regarded this a progress and a burden alike, because prior they hadn't employed any rabbi and religion teacher due to the implied financial burden. In 1845 – according to the new law – a land-rabbinate, under Land-Rabbi Joseph Heilbut, was established in the city, serving 16 Jewish congregations, which were founded over the years in the whole Stade Region, with altogether 1,250 Jews in 1864 (highest number ever reached). The local authorities now requested, that the Jewish congregations establish synagogues and Jewish education for the pupils.

In 1849 Stade's synagogue opened, but had to close due to financial restrictions in 1908. And a teacher for Jewish religion and Hebrew was employed (after 1890 Stade's community couldn't afford a teacher any more). From 1903 on the Jewish community of Stade was granted public subsidies to continue functioning. The Stade Region stayed a Jewish diaspora, and from 1860 on Stade's land-rabbinate was never staffed again, but served alternately by one of the other three Hanoverian land-rabbinates. Labour migration and emigration to urban centres outside the Stade Region and Jewish demography rather lead to a reduction of the number of Jews in the Stade Region (786 in 1913, 716 in 1928). However, most of the remaining Jews were deported during the Nazi reign. During World War II, Stade remained completely untouched by allied bombings.

In past decades, Stade has economically benefited significantly from the presence of chemical and aerospace industry at the Elbe river, most notably Dow Chemical and Airbus. Also by the Elbe at Stade is the decommissioned Stade Nuclear Power Plant, which was connected to the power grid from 1972 to 2003. By the time the plant was brought offline, it was Germany's second oldest reactor. Following Germany's 2002 decision to phase out nuclear power generation, Stade was the first German plant to be affected; it was closed down permanently on 14 November 2003. Close to the former nuclear plant there is an inactive oil-fired power station, the Schilling Power Station.

Sights

Located near to Stade are the gigantic pylons of Elbe Crossing 1 and Elbe Crossing 2; the Elbe Crossing 2 pylons are the tallest in Europe and the sixth-tallest in the world.

Transport
In late 2007, line S3 of the S-Bahn Hamburg was extended to Stade. Trains depart Stade station every 20 minutes (at peak times), arriving at Hamburg central station in roughly one hour.

Local industry
Firms with notable locations in the area include:
 Dow Chemical, chemicals
 Airbus Deutschland GmbH, aerospace
 E.ON, power plant
 Air Liquide, industrial gases
 Air Products & Chemicals, industrial gases
 Aluminium Oxid Stade GmbH, aluminium oxide refinery
 Stähler Agrochemie, fertilizer and biocides
 PROKON Nord Energiesysteme GmbH, wind turbines and biofuel
 Lindemann (Bauunternehmen), construction

Twin towns – sister cities

Stade is twinned with:
 Giv'at Shmuel, Israel
 Gołdap, Poland
 Karlshamn, Sweden

Notable people

Maria Aurora von Königsmarck (1662–1728), countess, mistress of Augustus the Strong 
Amalia von Königsmarck (1663–1740), Swedish noble, dilettante painter, actor and poet
Peter von Sivers (1674–1740), Russian naval officer
August Karl von Goeben (1816–1880), Prussian general
Max von Bahrfeldt (1856–1936), Prussian general of the infantry
Ernst Hans Ludwig Krause (1859–1942), physician, botanist and mycologist
Jost Fitschen (1869–1947), botanist known for his work in the field of dendrology
Ernst-Eberhard Hell (1887–1973), general in Wehrmacht during World War II
Ulrich de Maizière (1912–2006), general, created the "Innere Führung" in the Bundeswehr
Eberhard von Koerber (1938–2017), manager and on the Board of BMW
Stefan Aust (born 1946), journalist, chief editor of Der Spiegel in 1994–2008
Carsten Eggers (born 1957), sculptor and painter
Angela Denoke (born 1961), opera singer
Dirk Dammann (born 1967), footballer
Andrasch Starke (born 1974), jockey
Peter Ording (born 1976), rower
Juliette Schoppmann (born 1980), singer

Gallery

See also
Horstsee

References

External links

Official website 
Official tourism organisation Ge/En/Swe
Culture and convention center in Stade 
Virtual visit at the Fischmarkt (Fish Market) 

 
994 establishments
Members of the Hanseatic League
Landmarks in Germany
Holocaust locations in Germany
10th-century establishments in Germany
Populated riverside places in Germany
Populated places on the Elbe